Mamporal is a city in Miranda State, Venezuela. It is the capital of Buroz Municipality. Its name is said to derive from the indigenous word mampora, a name for a local plant.

Cities in Miranda (state)